Little Busters is an album released by the Pillows on February 21, 1998. The album was produced by Zin Yoshida of Salon Music. Several songs from the record were later featured in the anime mini-series FLCL by Gainax. In 2020, Jonathan McNamara of The Japan Times listed it as one of the 10 Japanese albums worthy of inclusion on Rolling Stone's 2020 list of the 500 greatest albums of all time.

Track listing
 "Hello, Welcome to Bubbletown's Happy Zoo (instant show)" - 2:20
  - 4:36
 "One Life" (album mix) - 4:05
 "That House" - 4:21
 "Like a Lovesong (Back to Back)" album mix - 3:04
 "Nowhere" - 5:07
  - 4:01
 "Blues Drive Monster" - 3:25
  - 4:55
 "Black Sheep" - 3:26
 "Little Busters" - 3:41
"Little Busters (Reprise)" - 1:47 (Hidden track)

References

1998 albums
The Pillows albums